Miguel Ángel Albarracín (born June 8, 1981 in Pinto, Santiago del Estero) is a male judoka from Argentina, who won the gold medal at the 2007 Pan American Games in Rio de Janeiro. He represented his native country at the 2004 Summer Olympics in Athens, Greece.

External links
 Profile 
 
 
 

1981 births
Living people
Argentine male judoka
Judoka at the 2004 Summer Olympics
Judoka at the 2008 Summer Olympics
Judoka at the 2003 Pan American Games
Judoka at the 2007 Pan American Games
Olympic judoka of Argentina
Sportspeople from Santiago del Estero Province
Pan American Games gold medalists for Argentina
Pan American Games bronze medalists for Argentina
Pan American Games medalists in judo
South American Games gold medalists for Argentina
South American Games silver medalists for Argentina
South American Games medalists in judo
Competitors at the 2002 South American Games
Competitors at the 2006 South American Games
Medalists at the 2007 Pan American Games
20th-century Argentine people
21st-century Argentine people